Peripeplus is a genus of flowering plants belonging to the family Rubiaceae.

Its native range is Gabon.

Species:
 Peripeplus bracteosus (Hiern) E.M.A.Petit

References

Rubiaceae
Rubiaceae genera